Recurvaria is a genus of moths in the family Gelechiidae.

Species
Recurvaria annulicornis (Walsingham, 1897)
Recurvaria cinerella Chretien, 1908
Recurvaria comprobata (Meyrick, 1935)
Recurvaria consimilis Braun, 1930
Recurvaria costimaculella Huemer & Karsholt, 2001
Recurvaria dryozona (Meyrick, 1916)
Recurvaria eromene (Walsingham, 1897)
Recurvaria febriculella (Zeller, 1877)
Recurvaria filicornis (Zeller, 1877)
Recurvaria flagellifer Walsingham, 1910
Recurvaria francisca Keifer, 1928
Recurvaria insequens Meyrick, 1931
Recurvaria intermissella (Zeller, 1877)
Recurvaria kittella (Walsingham, 1897)
Recurvaria leucatella (Clerck, 1759) - white-barred groundling moth
Recurvaria melanostictella (Zeller, 1877)
Recurvaria merismatella (Zeller, 1877)
Recurvaria nanella (Denis & Schiffermuller, 1775) - lesser bud moth
Recurvaria nothostigma Meyrick, 1914
Recurvaria ochrospila Meyrick, 1934
Recurvaria ornatipalpella (Walsingham, 1897)
Recurvaria ostariella (Walsingham, 1897)
Recurvaria penetrans Meyrick, 1923
Recurvaria picula Walsingham, 1910
Recurvaria pleurosaris Meyrick, 1923
Recurvaria putella Busck, 1914
Recurvaria rhicnota Walsingham, 1910
Recurvaria rhombophorella (Zeller, 1877)
Recurvaria sartor Walsingham, 1910
Recurvaria saxea Meyrick, 1923
Recurvaria senariella (Zeller, 1877)
Recurvaria stibomorpha Meyrick, 1929
Recurvaria sticta Walsingham, 1910
Recurvaria synestia Meyrick, 1939
Recurvaria taphiopis Meyrick, 1929
Recurvaria thiodes Meyrick, 1917
Recurvaria thomeriella (Chretien, 1901)
Recurvaria thysanota Walsingham, 1910
Recurvaria toxicodendri Kuznetsov, 1979
Recurvaria trigonophorella (Zeller, 1877)
Recurvaria vestigata Meyrick, 1929
Recurvaria xanthotricha Meyrick, 1917

References

External links
 
 

 
Litini
Moth genera